Bernard Fresson (27 May 1931 – 20 October 2002) was a French actor who primarily worked in film. 

Born in Reims, France, to a French baker, Fresson attended the Lycée privé Sainte-Geneviève, majoring in law. He studied in Tania Balachova's drama class in Paris and later became part of Jean Vilar's Théâtre National Populaire at the Palais de Chaillot. 

He made his on-screen debut in the Alain Renais film Hiroshima mon amour as a German soldier. His notable film roles include: Gilbert in La Prisonnière (1968), Inspector Barthelmy in John Frankenheimer's French Connection II (1975), Scope in Roman Polanski's The Tenant (1976), Francis in Garçon! (1983), Morin in Street of No Return (1989) and Vincent Malivert in Place Vendôme (1998). He also appeared in the 1969 Costa-Gavras film Z.

For his roles in Garçon! and Place Vendôme, Fresson received a César nomination for Best Supporting Actor.

Filmography

Film

Television

References

External links
 

1931 births
2002 deaths
French male film actors
French male television actors
20th-century French male actors
Actors from Reims
HEC Paris alumni
Deaths from cancer in France
Burials at Père Lachaise Cemetery